Phosphatidylinositol 3,4,5-trisphosphate-dependent Rac exchanger 1 protein is a protein that in humans is encoded by the PREX1 gene.

Function 

The protein encoded by this gene acts as a guanine nucleotide exchange factor for the RHO family of small GTP-binding proteins (RACs).  It has been shown to bind to and activate RAC1 by exchanging bound GDP for free GTP. The encoded protein, which is found mainly in the cytoplasm, is activated by phosphatidylinositol-3,4,5-trisphosphate and the beta-gamma subunits of heterotrimeric G proteins. The activation of P-REX1 is efficient when chemotactic receptors coupled to Gi proteins are activated, as a consequence of a better release of the Gβɣ heterodimer.

Clinical significance 

The protein has been implicated in the spread of melanoma skin cancer.

References

Further reading